Deserve This EP is an EP by the American hard rock band Adelitas Way, released on March 11, 2015 in digital format.

Release
The EP's first and only single, "I Get Around", was initially released for exclusive download on the band's Pledge Music Campaign along with the EPs self-titled track. The EP was originally planned for a release on March 17, but was released a week earlier instead.

Track listing

Personnel 
Adelitas Way
 Rick DeJesus – lead vocals
 Trevor Stafford – drums, percussion
 Robert Zakaryan – lead guitar, rhythm guitar
 Andrew Cushing – bass guitar

References

2015 EPs
Adelitas Way albums